Rebecca McFarland (18 April 1973  in New Orleans, Louisiana) is an American mixed media portrait artist and actress.

Early life 
McFarland grew up in New Orleans and attended Tulane University, where she graduated with a BA in theater.

Career

McFarland achieved early success as George's girlfriend on the Seinfeld episode "The Little Kicks."  She has worked consistently for twenty years including as Val Gibson Working (1998–1999). She had several more appearances in series such as Big Easy (1996), Diagnosis: Murder (1996), Star Trek: Voyager (1997), NYPD Blue (2001–2002), CSI: Crime Scene Investigation (2003), Charmed (2003), NCIS (2005), Ghost Whisperer (2010), The Mentalist (2012), and as a bartender in Two and a Half Men (2003–2012). More recently she has appeared on the TNT  series Saving Grace, starred in the NBC pilot Man of Your Dreams, and in the CBS pilot The Eastmans, opposite Donald Sutherland. She has a recurring role on Faking It as Farrah Raudenfeld.

Artist

In 2016, McFarland left acting to become a mixed media portrait artist. She paints with several textural elements on canvas, cradle board, recycled materials, and vintage leather jackets.

Filmography

Television

References

External links
 
 Artwork website
 
 

American film actresses
American television actresses
Living people
Actresses from New Orleans
Tulane University alumni
20th-century American actresses
21st-century American actresses
1966 births